Old Harry may refer to:

 Old Harry oil field, in the Gulf of St. Lawrence, Newfoundland, Canada
 Old Harry Rocks, chalk formation at Handfast Point, Dorset, England
 Another name for the Devil